Florin Daniel Bratu (born 2 January 1980) is a Romanian football coach and former player, who played as forward.

Club career
Bratu began his career with Rapid Bucharest, but shortly after joining the first team, he was loaned to Tractorul Brașov in 2000. At Tractorul he scored eight goals in 27 Divizia B games, before returning to Rapid Bucharest. In the 2002–03 season he won the Divizia A title with Rapid, being the team's top-goalscorer with 11 goals.

In 2003, Turkish club Galatasaray announced that they had reached an agreement with Rapid for the transfer of Bratu with the player agreeing to a four-year deal and Galatasaray paying Rapid $2,75 million. In the 2007–08 season he was signed by Dinamo București from Nantes Atlantique and formed a couple in Dinamo's offence with Ionel Dănciulescu. The Romanian press called them "BD in action", a nickname inspired from the first letters of their family name and the Romanian movie "BD in action". In the summer of 2010 Bratu joined Litex Lovech on loan where he stayed until December of the same year. In January 2011, he signed for Liga I team Gaz Metan Mediaș. He played only 11 games for Gaz Metan, seven of them from the first minute and four as a substitute, and scored a goal, in August 2011, against Voința Sibiu.

In summer of 2012, Bratu signed a one-year contract with Gloria Bistrița, where he spent a few months before announcing his retirement.

International career
Bratu played 14 games and scored two goals at international level for Romania, making his debut on 12 February 2003 when coach Anghel Iordănescu sent him on the field in order to replace Adrian Mutu in the 90+2 minute of a friendly against Slovakia which ended with a 2–1 victory. He scored his first goal in a friendly which ended with a 1–0 victory against Lithuania. Bratu played four games and scored one goal in a 4–0 victory against Luxembourg at the Euro 2004 qualifiers. He also played in one game at the 2006 World Cup qualifiers, one at the Euro 2008 qualifiers and two at the 2010 World Cup qualifiers.

International goals
Scores and results list Romania's goal tally first, score column indicates score after each Bratu goal.

After retirement
Since retiring from football in the middle of the 2012–13 season, Bratu has gone into punditry and worked for a while as a commentator for Digi Sport (Romania).

In March 2014, Bratu became the head of the scouting department at his former club Dinamo București.

Coaching career
In August 2014, Bratu started his coaching career as head coach of the second team at Dinamo II București. On 25 February 2018, he was appointed head coach of Dinamo București. He was sacked in September 2018.

On 9 August 2021, he was named the head coach of Romania U-21.

Managerial statistics

Honours
Rapid București
Romanian League: 2002–03
Romanian Cup: 2001–02
Romanian Supercup: 2002, 2003
Dinamo București
Romanian Supercup: 2005
Litex Lovech
Bulgarian Supercup: 2010

References

External links

1980 births
Living people
Footballers from Bucharest
Association football forwards
Romanian footballers
Romania international footballers
FC Rapid București players
Galatasaray S.K. footballers
FC Dinamo București players
FC Nantes players
Valenciennes FC players
PFC Litex Lovech players
CS Gaz Metan Mediaș players
Liga I players
Liga II players
Süper Lig players
Ligue 1 players
First Professional Football League (Bulgaria) players
Romanian expatriate footballers
Expatriate footballers in Turkey
Romanian expatriate sportspeople in Turkey
Expatriate footballers in France
Romanian expatriate sportspeople in France
Expatriate footballers in Bulgaria
Romanian expatriate sportspeople in Bulgaria
Romanian football managers
FC Dinamo București managers
CS Aerostar Bacău managers
AFC Turris-Oltul Turnu Măgurele managers
CS Concordia Chiajna managers